The Permanent Representative to the Council of Europe is the senior member of the United Kingdom's delegation to the Council of Europe, based in Strasbourg.

The Permanent Representative has the personal rank of Ambassador.

Permanent representatives
1951–1952: Cyril Wakefield-Harrey 
1952–1955: Peter Scarlett
1955–1959: Gerald Meade
1959–1962: John Peck
1962–1965: Ivor Porter
1965–1969: Basil Boothby
1969–1974: John Robey 
1974–1978: Peter Foster 
1978–1983: Donald Cape
1983–1986: Christopher Lush 
1986–1990: Colin McLean
1990–1993: Noël Marshall 
1993–1997: Roger Beetham
1997–2003: Andrew Carter 
2003–2007: Stephen Howarth 
2007–2012: Eleanor Fuller 
2012–2016: Matthew Johnson 
2016–2020: Christopher Yvon
2020–2021: Neil Holland 

2021–: Sandy Moss

References

External links
UK Delegation to the Council of Europe – www.gov.uk
United Kingdom - Member state – Council of Europe

Council of Europe
United Kingdom Permanent Representative